4954 Eric is an eccentric, stony asteroid, classified as near-Earth object of the  Amor group, approximately  in diameter. It was discovered by American astronomer Brian Roman at Palomar Observatory on 23 September 1990. The asteroid was named after its discoverer's son, Eric Roman.

It is the largest near-Earth asteroid discovered since 3552 Don Quixote in 1983. On 2007 October 11 the asteroid passed  from Earth. It currently makes closer approaches to Mars than it does Earth. The asteroid has a rotation period of 12.05 hours.

Other large near-Earth asteroids include 1036 Ganymed (32 km), 3552 Don Quixote (19 km), 433 Eros (17 km), and 1866 Sisyphus (8.5 km).

References

External links
 
 

Amor asteroids
Eric
Eric
S-type asteroids (SMASS)
19900923